The state of New Hampshire has held two seals since it declared its independence from Great Britain on January 5, 1776. While both seals have been retained, most people are only familiar with the Great Seal due to its corporate use.

Great Seal

New Hampshire's state seal depicts the frigate  and is surrounded by a laurel wreath with nine stars. The Raleigh is one of the first 13 warships sponsored by the Continental Congress for a new American navy, built in 1776, at Portsmouth. The seal is surrounded by a laurel wreath. The wreath is an ancient symbol of fame, honor, and victory.  The nine stars within the wreath show that New Hampshire was the ninth state to join the Union.  The water stands for the harbor of Portsmouth, and in the yellow-colored spit of land is granite, a strong igneous rock, representing both New Hampshire's rugged landscape and the sturdy character of her people.

In 1784, when the present state constitution became effective, the legislature revised the seal to depict a ship on stocks, with a rising sun in the background, to reflect Portsmouth having become a major shipbuilding center during the American Revolutionary War. Over the years, various items for shipment were also shown on the frontal dock in the seal.

In 1919, New Hampshire Historical Society Director Otis G. Hammond, on the order of the Governor and Executive Council of New Hampshire, wrote a history of the state seal and flag. Hammond described how because the law governing the design of the seal was not very specific, when the dies wore down and had to be redesigned, the artists and sketchers had injected surprising details into the seal, such as rum barrels on the dock, sometimes including people standing beside them. In 1931, after Governor John G. Winant began his second term, he named a committee to produce a seal devoid of controversy. The General Court approved the committee's recommendations, later enacting a law codifying the official design of the state seal. The changes came into effect on January 1, 1932

State Seal law of 1931
The 1931 State Seal law placed the frigate Raleigh as the centerpiece of the new seal.  The Raleigh was built in Portsmouth in 1776, as one of the first 13 warships sponsored by the Continental Congress for a new American navy.  The law declared the seal to be 2 inches in diameter bearing the new inscription, SEAL • OF • THE • STATE • OF • NEW HAMPSHIRE, replacing the Latin phrase Sigillum Reipublicae Neo Hantoniensis. The law also declared that only a granite boulder could be shown in the foreground.

Flag

The flag of the state of New Hampshire consists of the state seal centered on a blue background.

It is one of two U.S. state flags to contain an image of the Stars and Stripes flag, the other being that of Utah.

A 2001 internet poll run by the North American Vexillological Association ranked New Hampshire state flag's design as 63rd out of 72 flags of U.S. states and U.S. territories), and provinces and territories of Canada. 

One elected official suggested replacing the state seal in the center of the flag with the Old Man of the Mountain, to memorialize its collapse in 2003, but no official action has been taken on the proposal.

Alternate seal

First independent seal
On July 1, 1774, the First Provincial Congress met for the first time in Exeter, and subsequently they discarded every "Royal," including the previous "George the III" seal.

In preparation of the 1776 state constitution, the First Provincial Congress designed a seal measuring 1½ inches in diameter and depicting an upright fish and pine tree on either side of a bundle of five arrows. The fish and pine represented the main trade of the colony and the five arrows represented each of the five counties.  The seal bore the inscription: COLONY OF NEW HAMPSHIRE * VIS UNITA FORTIOR.

The Latin motto vis unita fortior means "A united force (is) stronger." The motto was meant to unify the counties and was never officially proclaimed, but was used during the American Revolution until 1784.  While no official document prescribing the seal has been located, the first record of the seal is found on commissions issued to military officers by the Provincial Congress dated September 1, 1775. The last known use of the seal was on an act of the General Assembly on July 5, 1776. This seal continues to be published by the New Hampshire General Court on along with the modern seal, on the cover of copies of the State Constitution.

First state seal, 1776
It is believed that the die used to affix the seal was designed during the summer of 1776. The first state seal was officially prescribed in an act passed September 12, 1776, two days after the resolution of statehood.  The seal is still used by some members  of the General Court, though there is no current statute governing its design or use.

The size of the seal was increased to 1¾ inches, and comprised a pine tree and an upright fish, on each side of a bundle of five arrows. The design reflected the state's then two major economic resources, and the arrows symbolized the strength of unity among the then five counties. The seal bears the inscription (in Latin): SIGILL : REI - PUB : NEOHANTONI : * VIS UNITA FORTIOR*.

References

External links
 New Hampshire Revised Statutes Annotated (RSA) 3:9 State Seal
 New Hampshire Almanac - State Seal
 Anderson, Leon. History. Manual for the General Court 1981.
 NH RSA 3:2 State Flag
 New Hampshire Almanac - State Flag
 New Hampshire State Flag NH updated 1931
 

Symbols of New Hampshire
New Hampshire
New Hampshire
New Hampshire
New Hampshire
New Hampshire
New Hampshire